Luis Humberto Nieves Mancillas (born 6 June 1985 in Tepic, Nayarit) is a former Mexican professional footballer who last played for UAT.

References

External links
 

Living people
1985 births
Mexican footballers
Association football forwards
Club León footballers
Tecos F.C. footballers
Lobos BUAP footballers
Independiente Medellín footballers
Correcaminos UAT footballers
Leones Negros UdeG footballers
Deportivo Chiantla players
Liga MX players
Ascenso MX players
Categoría Primera A players
Liga Nacional de Fútbol de Guatemala players
Mexican expatriate footballers
Mexican expatriate sportspeople in Colombia
Mexican expatriate sportspeople in Guatemala
Expatriate footballers in Colombia
Expatriate footballers in Guatemala
Footballers from Nayarit
Sportspeople from Tepic, Nayarit